The 2019 Scotties BC Women's Curling Championship presented by Best Western and Nufloors, the provincial women's curling championship for British Columbia, was held January 29 to February 3 at the West Fraser Centre in Quesnel.  The winning Sarah Wark team represented British Columbia at the 2019 Scotties Tournament of Hearts in Sydney, Nova Scotia.

Qualification

Teams
The teams were listed as follows:

Round robin standings

Round robin results
All draw times are listed in Pacific Standard Time (UTC-08:00)

Draw 1
Tuesday, January 29, 9:00am

Draw 2
Tuesday, January 29, 2:00pm

Draw 3
Tuesday, January 29, 7:30pm

Draw 4
Wednesday, January 30, 9:00am

Draw 5
Wednesday, January 30, 2:00pm

Draw 6
Wednesday, January 30, 7:00pm

Draw 7
Thursday, January 31, 9:00am

Draw 9
Thursday, January 31, 7:00pm

Draw 10
Friday, February 1, 9:00am

Draw 11
Friday, February 1, 2:00pm

Playoffs

1 vs. 2
Saturday, February 2, 9:00am

3 vs. 4
Saturday, February 2, 2:00pm

Semifinal
Saturday, February 2, 7:00pm

Final
Sunday, February 3, 2:00pm

References

External links

2019 Scotties Tournament of Hearts
2019 in British Columbia
January 2019 sports events in Canada
February 2019 sports events in Canada
Curling in British Columbia
Cariboo Regional District